In Bed with Victoria (original title: Victoria) is a 2016 French romantic comedy-drama film directed by Justine Triet. It was screened in the International Critics' Week section at the 2016 Cannes Film Festival. Efira received a Magritte Award for Best Actress at the 7th Magritte Awards for her role in the film.

Cast
 Virginie Efira as Victoria Spick
 Vincent Lacoste as Sam
 Melvil Poupaud as Vincent
 Laurent Poitrenaux as David
 Laure Calamy as Christelle 
 Sophie Fillières as Sophie
 Alice Daquet as Eve
 Emmanuelle Lanfray

Release
The film had its world premiere opening the Semaine de la Critique at the Cannes Film Festival on 12 May 2016. It was released in France on 14 September 2016.

Reception

Box office
In Bed with Victoria grossed $0 in North America and $5 million worldwide, against a production budget of $4 million.

Critical response
On review aggregator Rotten Tomatoes, the film holds an approval rating of 82% based on 11 reviews with an average rating of 6.2/10. On Metacritic, it holds a weighted average score of 58 out of 100, based on 5 critics, indicating "mixed or average reviews".

Accolades

References

External links
 
 

2016 films
2016 comedy-drama films
2016 comedy films
2010s French-language films
French comedy-drama films
Films directed by Justine Triet
2010s French films